Mochong is a major prehistoric archaeological site on the island of Rota in the Northern Mariana Islands. It is considered the best preserved and second largest latte village in the Marianas. It is an extensive village site on the northern side of the island comprising 50 individual latte sets, scattered mortars (lusongs), scattered subsurface artifacts such as tools, fishing implements and abundance pieces of pottery; the Marianas Red Ware Pottery and the Marianas Plain Ware Pottery. This site also includes an extremely rare latte house structure consisting of 14 columns. The site has been radiocarbon dated to c. 1000 BCE. The site was first sketched in the early 19th century by the French explorer Louis de Freycinet, and was in remarkably intact condition (compared to those sketches) in the 1980s.

The site was listed on the National Register of Historic Places in 1985.

See also
National Register of Historic Places listings in the Northern Mariana Islands

References

Archaeological sites on the National Register of Historic Places in the Northern Mariana Islands
Rota (island)